Sandykgaçy is a village in and the seat of Sandykgaçy geňeşligi (rural council), Tagtabazar District, in Mary Province, Turkmenistan. It is located on the Murghab River. In the Soviet period the name was applied to a fruit and vegetable sovkhoz located at this village.

Etymology
The Turkmen word sandykgaçy means "box". Atanyyazow explains that in antiquity the name appeared as "Sandykgachan", meaning "boxed (in)", because of the high, steep slopes that enclose the village.

Transportation
The village is served by both the A-388 highway between Serhetabat and Ýolöten and a station on the rail line to Serhetabat.

References

Populated places in Mary Region